The 2010 Regions Morgan Keegan Championships and the Cellular South Cup was an ATP World Tour and WTA Tour event held at the hardcourts of the Racquet Club of Memphis in Memphis, Tennessee, US. It was the 35th edition of the Regions Morgan Keegan Championships and the 25th edition of the Cellular South Cup. The Regions Morgan Keegan Championships was part of the ATP World Tour 500 series on the 2010 ATP World Tour, and the Cellular South Cup was an International-level tournament on the 2010 WTA Tour. The ATP event took place from February 13 to February 21, 2010, and the WTA event from February 12 to February 20.

The men's draw was led by 2009 Wimbledon finalist, 2010 Brisbane International champion and defending champion Andy Roddick, Fernando Verdasco, 2010 Heineken Open champion John Isner, and 2010 Brisbane International runner-up Radek Štěpánek. Other players are Tommy Haas, Philipp Kohlschreiber, and James Blake

The women's draw was headed by former world No. 1 Maria Sharapova, 2009 US Open quarterfinalist Melanie Oudin, homenation player Vania King, Kaia Kanepi, Czechs Lucie Hradecká and Petra Kvitová

WTA entrants

Seeds

Rankings are as of February 8, 2010.

Other entrants
The following players received wildcards into the main draw:
 Bethanie Mattek-Sands
 Ajla Tomljanović
 Nicole Vaidišová

The following players received entry from the qualifying draw:
 Sofia Arvidsson
 Madison Brengle
 Alexa Glatch
 Valérie Tétreault

ATP entrants

Seeds

Rankings are as of February 8, 2010.

Other entrants
The following players received wildcards into the main draw:
 Robby Ginepri
 Wayne Odesnik
 Bobby Reynolds

The following players received entry from the qualifying draw:
 Kevin Anderson
 Ryan Harrison
 Robert Kendrick
 Ryan Sweeting

Finals

Men's singles

 Sam Querrey defeated  John Isner, 6–7(3–7), 7–6(7–5), 6–3
It was Querrey's first title of the year and 3rd of his career.

Women's singles

 Maria Sharapova defeated  Sofia Arvidsson, 6–2, 6–1
It was Sharapova's first title of the year and 21st of her career.

Men's doubles

 John Isner /  Sam Querrey defeated  Ross Hutchins /  Jordan Kerr, 6–4, 6–4

Women's doubles

 Vania King /  Michaëlla Krajicek defeated  Bethanie Mattek-Sands /  Meghann Shaughnessy, 7–5, 6–2

External links
 Official site
 Men's Singles draw
 Men's Doubles draw
 Women's Combined draws

 
Regions Morgan Keegan Championships
Cellular South Cup
Regions Morgan Keegan Championships and the Cellular South Cupl
Regions Morgan Keegan Championships and the Cellular South Cup
Regions Morgan Keegan Championships and the Cellular South Cup
cs:Regions Morgan Keegan Championships 2010
fr:Tournoi de Memphis 2010 (ATP)
fr:Tournoi de Memphis 2010 (WTA)